Nina Morgunova (born 21 April 1951) is a retired female middle distance runner who represented the Soviet Union in the 1970s. She set her personal best in the women's 1,500 metres (4:06.0) on 1975-09-07 at a meet in Moscow.

References
Profile

1951 births
Living people
Soviet female middle-distance runners
Russian female middle-distance runners
Universiade medalists in athletics (track and field)
Universiade gold medalists for the Soviet Union
Medalists at the 1975 Summer Universiade